Céline Montaland (10 August 1843 – 8 January 1891) was a French actress, dancer and singer.

Biography
Céline Montaland was born on 10 August 1843 in Ghent, Belgium. Her parents, Pierre Montaland and Mathilde Chevalier, were actors. She was trained by her father, who was a former actor at Théâtre du Vaudeville. She made her debut at the age of six at Comédie-Française in the role of Camille in  Gabrielle (1849) of Émile Augier. She was the “youngest actress ever to perform at this theater.” She performed a number of children roles, which were specially created for her.

In 1860 she returned to Paris after a worldwide musical tour by her theatrical troupe which got a wide public attention. She continued to perform in different popular theaters including Théâtre du Palais-Royal, Odéon-Théâtre de l'Europe  and  Comédie-Française. At the end of her distinguished theatrical career, she became a Sociétaire at the Comédie-Française in 1888.

She died in Paris, France on 8 January 1891.

References

1843 births
1891 deaths
19th-century French actresses
19th-century French women singers
French stage actresses